Edinburgh Air Charter Flight 3W, call sign "Saltire 3 Whisky", was a charter flight from Glasgow to Aberdeen. A Cessna 404 Titan, G-ILGW, was used for this flight. The flight had been chartered by Airtours International Airways to transport two pilots and seven flight attendants. Upon arrival in Aberdeen, the Airtours crewmembers were scheduled to operate a Boeing 757 on a charter flight to Palma de Mallorca.

Shortly after takeoff, the left engine failed and the pilot-in-command feathered the right engine. Instead of attempting a crash landing, the pilot attempted to return to Glasgow Airport without engine power and lost control while trying to make a right turn. The aircraft crashed and caught fire approximately one nautical mile from the airport. The two Edinburgh Air Charter pilots, the Airtours First Officer, and five AirTours flight attendants died in the crash. The AirTours captain and two flight attendants survived.

The aircraft was slightly overweight for the conditions. A report recommended engine inspections, more crash-worthy seats, and consideration to fitting aircraft like this with CVRs. As a result of this accident an airworthiness directive was issued by the British Civil Aviation Authority in June 2000, requiring inspections of the starter adapters and crankshaft gears on Continental GTSIO-520 series engines.

See also
Other cases where pilots shut down the wrong engine when dealing with engine failure:
British Midland Flight 092
TransAsia Airways Flight 235
Airlink Flight 8911

References

Aviation accidents and incidents in 1999
Aviation accidents and incidents in Scotland
1999 in Scotland
Airliner accidents and incidents caused by engine failure